The Pangong Bridge is a historic stone arch bridge over the Free Life River in Longquan Subdistrict, Wuxing District of Huzhou, Zhejiang, China.

Etymology
Pangong Bridge is named after Pan Jixun, commonly known as Pan Gong.

History
Construction of the Pangong Bridge, designed by scholar-official and hydrologist Pan Jixun, commenced in 1585 and was completed in 1590, during the ruling of Wanli Emperor of the Ming dynasty (1368–1644). In 1839, in the 19th year of the Daoguang period of the Qing dynasty (1644–1911), the original five-hole stone beam bridge was changed into a three-hole stone arch bridge to increase the water discharge.

On 6 May 2013, it was listed among the seventh batch of "Major National Historical and Cultural Sites in Zhejiang" by the State Council of China.

Gallery

References

Bridges in Zhejiang
Arch bridges in China
Bridges completed in 1839
Qing dynasty architecture
Buildings and structures completed in 1839
1839 establishments in China
Major National Historical and Cultural Sites in Zhejiang